Cao Lộc is a township (thị trấn) and capital of Cao Lộc District, Lạng Sơn Province, Vietnam.

References

Populated places in Lạng Sơn province
Communes of Lạng Sơn province
District capitals in Vietnam
Townships in Vietnam